Franco-German War may refer to any war fought between France and Germany, including:

 Franco-German war of 978–980
 The Franco-Prussian War
 World War I
 World War II